Antonio Jesús Naguiat Molina (December 26, 1894 – January 29, 1980) was a Filipino composer, conductor and music administrator. He was named a National Artist of the Philippines for his services to music.
He was also known as the Claude Debussy of the Philippines due to his use of impressionist themes in music.

Early life 
Molina was born on December 26, 1894 in Quiapo, Manila, the son of Juan Molina, a government official, who founded the Molina Orchestra. He attended the Escuela Catolica de Nuestro Padre Jesus Nazareno in Quiapo, Manila, and college at San Juan De Letran where he was awarded a Bachelor of Arts degree in 1909.

Musical career 
Molina made his first composition in 1912 titled Matinal, which is preserved in an unpublished volume called Miniaturas, Vol. 1. He was appointed to teach harmony, composition, music history, and violincello at the UP Conservatory of Music, pursuing a career in music education until being appointed dean of the Centro Escolar Conservatory of Music. He founded the CEU String Quartet which was professionally organized and financed by its music school.

As a composer Molina is credited with over 500 compositions.

Influences 
Molina stated in his interview conducted by Helen F. Samson that his music was usually inspired by literature, with his favorite being La Novia Muerta by Ruben Daria.

Death 
Molina died on January 29, 1980 at age 85.

References 

1894 births
1980 deaths
20th-century composers
Burials at the Libingan ng mga Bayani
Colegio de San Juan de Letran alumni
Filipino classical composers
Musicians from Manila
National Artists of the Philippines
People from Quiapo, Manila